Dr. Babasaheb Ambedkar Marathwada University (BAMU), formerly Marathwada University, is located in Aurangabad, Maharashtra, India.  It is named after B. R. Ambedkar, an Indian jurist and political leader. The university was established on 23 August 1958. This university has contributed to the progress of adjoining regions and people in innumerable ways. Since its inception, the university has around 456 colleges affiliated to it, which come under four districts (Aurangabad, Jalna, Beed and Osmanabad) of Maharashtra State.

History

There were nine colleges in Marathwada, listed below, all affiliated with Osmania University at Hyderabad in current Telangana state. In response to demand of the public in Marathwada region for a university, the government appointed on 27 April 1957 a committee with the charter to provide recommendations regarding establishment of such a university. The governor of Bombay state signed the Marathwada University Act on 5 May 1958. Shri Jawaharlal Nehru, the first Prime Minister of India, inaugurated Marathwada University on 23 August 1958 at Aurangabad on the premises of the temporary main building of the university.

S.R. Dongerkery became the first vice-chancellor. Affiliation of the following nine colleges was transferred from Osmania University to the newly formed Marathwada University:
 The Government College of Arts and Science, Aurangabad (established in 1923).
 The Milind Mahavidyalaya, Aurangabad (established in 1950).
 The People's College, Nanded (established in 1950).
 The Government College of Education, Aurangabad (established in 1954).
 The Marathwada College of Agriculture, Parbhani (established in 1956).
 The Manikchand Pahade Law College, Aurangabad (established in 1956).
 The Government Medical College, Aurangabad (established in 1956).
 The Yogeshwari Science College, Mominabad (established in 1956).
 The Arts and S.B.L. Commerce College, Jalna (established in 1958).

Namantar Andolan
 
In 1978, the Maharashtra Chief Minister, the state legislature and University administration approved the renaming University after B. R. Ambedkar. This decision was strongly opposed by Hindu community resulting in the anti-Dalit pogrom. The Namantar Andolan  was the renaming movement raised by Dalits for 16 years. On 14 January 1994 the University name was renamed as "Dr. Babasaheb Ambedkar Marathwada University".

Library
Knowledge Resource Centre is the main library of the University. The University library was founded in the year 1958 as the Varsity library. The University library houses some old books dating all the way back to the year 1600. Recently Knowledge Resource Centre subscribed to the World E-book Library through a Noida-based company, which will enable the students to access over 300,000 e-books including journals and other documents.

Coat of arms

The university's coat of arms bears the following emblems:
 An Ajanta Arch with the university motto inscribed in its base. The arch is a symbol of the glory of the art of painting and sculpture which reached their acme in the Ajanta Caves.
 An open book lying on a book-rest, symbolising learning.
 A sheaf of jowar, representing agriculture, the chief means of livelihood of the people of Marathwada.
 Two elephants, representing the strength of purpose of the people of Marathwada.
 A wheel representing progress.

Academics and departments
BAMU has 56 departments running in its Campus and Sub-Campus. On 5 August 2004, a subcenter of BAMU was established at Osmanabad. It has been temporarily started at Government Ayurvedic College in Osmanabad. It has ten PG departments including Computer Science and IT, Physics and Chemistry.

Student halls of residence
There are separate halls of residence for both boys and girls enrolled at the university.

Notable alumni 

 Makarand Anaspure
 Ravindra Gaikwad
Dr Tatyarao Lahane
Dr Bhagwat Kishanrao Karad
 Sunil Gaikwad
 Imtiyaz Jaleel
 Madhusudan Manikrao Kendre
 Fouzia Khan
 Irfan ur Rahman Khan
 Gangadhar Pantawane
 Nirupama Rao
 Sukhadeo Thorat
 Varsha Usgaonkar
 Janardan Waghmare

See also
 Aurangabad, Maharashtra
 Marathwada University Ground

References

External links

BAMU website 

 
1958 establishments in Bombay State
Education in Aurangabad, Maharashtra
Educational institutions established in 1958
Universities in Maharashtra
Marathwada
Tourist attractions in Aurangabad district, Maharashtra